Shuangmiao is a town under the administration of Hanggin Rear Banner in southwestern Inner Mongolia, China, located about  southwest of the banner seat and  north-northwest of downtown Bayannur. , it has 14 villages under its administration.

See also 
 List of township-level divisions of Inner Mongolia

References 

Township-level divisions of Inner Mongolia